Belu Regency is a regency in East Nusa Tenggara province of Indonesia. Established on 20 December 1958, Belu Regency has its seat (capital) in the large town of Atambua.

In December 2012 a separate Regency  - Malaka Regency - was created from the twelve districts that formerly comprised the southern half of Belu Regency. Belu means friend in Tetum. The residual part of Belu Regency had a population of 188,163 at the 2010 Census, which rose to 206,476 at the 2015 Census and to 217,973 at the 2020 Census. The official estimate as at mid 2021 was 227,397.

Administrative Districts 
The Belu Regency was until 2013 divided into twenty-four districts (kecamatan), but in December 2012, the twelve southern kecamatan were removed to form the new Malaka Regency, leaving the twelve northern kecamatan in Belu Regency. The residual Belu Regency is thus composed of twelve districts (kecamatan), tabulated below with their areas (in km2) and their populations at the 2010 Census and 2020 Census, together with the official estimates as at mid 2021. The table also includes the location of the district headquarters, the number of administrative villages (rural desa and urban kelurahan) in each district, and its postal code.

Note: (a) the five westerly rural kecamatan, mainly surrounding or south of Atambua. (b) the area projecting into East Timor.

Media 
Belu Regency is served with four radio stations that cover the wider area around this regency (including Malaka Regency, Alor Regency, and Timor Tengah Utara Regency), which are RRI Pro1 Atambua (FM 91.5 MHz) RRI Pro2 Atambua (FM 99.8 MHz) RRI Pro3 (FM 99.0 MHz), and Saluran Citra Budaya Timor (alias Pro4) (FM 93.1 MHz). There's still a lot of radio that can be found in the town.

The regency is only served with two television stations (TVRI - including TVRI East Nusa Tenggara, Belu TV) and a few other East Timor stations that reach the border pass.

References 

Regencies of East Nusa Tenggara